The National Electrical Contractors Association (NECA) is a trade association in the United States that represents the electrical contracting industry. NECA supports the businesses that bring power, light, and communication technology to buildings and communities. Through advocacy, education, research, and standards development, NECA works to advance the electrical contracting industry.

History
After the invention of the electric light, a new industry sprang up to install electricity in homes and businesses. With little industry regulation or standardization, electrical projects were sometimes haphazard and regularly slow, since parts often had to be custom made for a project.

In 1901, a group of electrical contractors met at the Pan-American Exposition in Buffalo, New York and organized the National Electrical Contractors Association of the United States. The organization’s first constitution stated their objectives: “The fostering of trade among electrical contractors…to reform abuses…to settle differences between its members…and to promote more enlarged and friendly discourse among its members.″

Organization
NECA's national office is in Washington, DC, with 119 local chapters located across the United States. On the national level, NECA supports the electrical contracting industry through advocacy, education, research, and standards development. At the local level, each NECA chapter is an independently chartered organization with autonomy to elect officers, determine priorities, set member dues and service charges, and help negotiate labor agreements with their local International Brotherhood of Electrical Workers (IBEW) union(s).

NECA is led by a chief executive officer and an elected president, board of governors, district vice presidents, and committees.

NECA Members
NECA represents electrical contractors from firms of all sizes, performing a range of services. While most NECA contractors are small businesses, many large, multinational companies are also members of the association. A directory of these contractors can be found at NECA Connection

NECA Programs and Services
NECA provides members with advocacy, education, research, safety and standards development, as well as the annual NECA Show.

Advocacy
Labor Relations: At both the national and local levels, NECA works closely with IBEW to develop mutually acceptable national and local agreements. 

Government Affairs: NECA’s Government Affairs office focuses on legislation and regulations that would affect electrical contractors and the construction industry as a whole.
Through legislative monitoring, grassroots and constituent action, lobbying, and the $1 million-plus Electrical Construction Political Action Committee (ECPAC), NECA informs key policymakers of the views of electrical contractors.

Research
NECA is the founding sponsor of ELECTRI International—The Foundation for Electrical Construction, Inc. ELECTRI sponsors research by industry leaders, focused on the business and project management practices that impact electrical contractors. Topics for research include improving productivity, using project labor agreements, and bench marking safety programs.

Industry Information
NECA produces numerous information resources addressing business and project management, labor relations, codes and standards, safety, marketing, government affairs and regulation, and technical issues. 

NECA Education provides management education and supervisory training programs for industry leaders; NECA publishes ELECTRICAL CONTRACTOR magazine, the industry’s top source of information on electrical construction; and NECA sponsors the electrical contracting industry’s premier convention and trade show.

References

External links

Directory of NECA Electrical Contractors
ELECTRICAL CONTRACTOR magazine
ELECTRI International: The Foundation for Electrical Construction, Inc.
NECA Convention & Tradeshow
NECA on Facebook

Trade associations based in the United States
Electric power in the United States
Electrical trades organizations
Electrical wiring
Organizations established in 1901